Gopal Krishna College of Engineering & Technology (commonly known as GKCET) is an engineering and technology institute established in 1999. It is a unit of the IEM Society established by Gopal Krushna Nahak in 1989. GKCET is in Jeypore, Odisha, India.

Gopal Krishna College of Engineering & Technology is a center for technical education in Odisha.

Courses offered
The institute offers the following B.Tech. courses:

Affiliation and accreditation
GKCET is affiliated to Biju Patnaik University of Technology (BPUT), Rourkela, Odisha. It is approved by All India Council for Technical Education (AICTE), New Delhi. It has been accredidated by National Assessment and Accreditation Council (NAAC) since 2015. It is also certified by ISO 9001:2015 for maintaining quality measures.

Organisation structure

Admission
Qualified candidates can apply for admission in any of the four-year B.Tech. (Bachelor of Technology) degree programs, as well as directly in second year (Lateral Entry) in B.Tech. Admissions are made through Odisha Joint Entrance Examination (OJEE) & JEE MAIN Entrance Examination.

Infrastructure and Facilities
It has planned buildings, which includes multi-storeyed main building housing classrooms, laboratories, library, seminar hall, examination hall, offices, IT Lab, drawing hall, canteen, auditorium, etc. Separate hostel facility for boys and girls.

Social Work
GKCET has two units of NSS & also has a registered Youth Red Cross Unit. The NSS units conduct various social awareness programmes & also conducts field visit to various villages and surrounding areas for supporting the environmental cause as well as supporting the people in their day-to-day life. The NSS also organises various programmes like Swachh Bharat Abhiyan, Earth Hour, Drug Free India, Gandhi GLobal Solar Yatra, Save Forests - Save Trees, One Student - One Tree Initiative etc. The Youth Red Cross Unit organises blood donation camps on various occasions.

References

{{DEFAULTSORT:[http:  www.gkcet.in Gopal Krishna College of Engineering and Technology}}
Engineering colleges in Odisha
Colleges affiliated with Biju Patnaik University of Technology
Koraput district
Educational institutions established in 1999
1999 establishments in Orissa